Tropical Cyclone Filao was a moderately intense tropical cyclone that caused widespread flooding in Mozambique in 1988. First classified as a tropical depression north of Madagascar, the system moved southwest, crossing the northern part of the nation before entering the Mozambique Channel on February 27, where it began to deepen. Later that day, the depression was upgraded into a moderate tropical storm. Two days later, Filao attained severe tropical storm intensity as it began to stall. On March 1, the storm reached cyclone intensity just before turning west. Within 24 hours, however, the system moved ashore near Quelimane in Central Mozambique, and several hours later, Filao dissipated inland.

Cyclone Filao killed 100 people in Mozambique, primarily in rural areas. Damage was heaviest in Quelimane, where wind gusts reached  and rainfall totaled . There, 57 people were killed and 7,375 were left homeless. Elsewhere, the Pungwe River and  Limpopo River experienced severe flooding, with the former sustaining its worst flood of the decade. Power and telephone services were also knocked out while a road that connected Mozambique to Zimbabwe was destroyed. In all,  of crops were destroyed. Damage totaled to $10 million, including $1.5 million in property damage.

Meteorological history

On February 23, Météo-France's office on the island of Réunion (MFR) started monitoring a tropical depression to the northeast of Madagascar. At this time, the depression developed a closed circulation, which received a rating of T1.5 on the Dvorak Scale, a tool used to estimate a system's intensity. Shortly thereafter, the Joint Typhoon Warning Center (JTWC) first classified the system, designating it as 14S. Following a slight increase in organization, the depression moved southwest and quickly crossed the tip of northern Madagascar. After weakening over land, the depression reentered the Mozambique channel near Analalava on February 25. Based on a 3.0 Dvorak classification, MFR upgraded the storm into a moderate tropical storm on February 27; the JTWC would follow suit later that day.

After reaching the 40th meridian, Filao turned south, which weakened a ridge. The ridge near the system began to re-strengthen, causing Filao to move erratically, first west, and then northwest. The new position of the ridge provided highly favorable conditions aloft, resulting in a period of rapid deepening. By February 29, MFR upgraded the storm into a severe tropical storm, while the JTWC estimated that Filao attained hurricane-force. Early on March 1, data from MFR indicated that Filao reached its peak intensity of 85 mph (135 km/h) and its minimum pressure of 954 mbar (hPa); 28.17 inHg, in agreement with T4.5 and T5.0 from the Dvorak Technique. Despite a decrease in satellite intensity estimates, Filao held on to this intensity until 1800 UTC, when the storm made landfall near Quelimane in Mozambique. Cyclone Filao quickly weakened over land; both agencies suggest that the storm dissipated on March 2 over the Zambeze Valley and embedded into the Intertropical Convergence Zone (ITCZ).

Preparations and impact
Due to the weak nature of the storm while crossing Madagascar, damage was minor.

Although the cyclone affected a sparsely populated region of Mozambique, Filao brought heavy rains.

The Zambezia Province, where Quelimane is located, sustained the worst damage from the cyclone. Throughout Quelimane, 57 fatalities were reported and 800 homes were damaged. Eleven people were wounded, 7,375 persons were rendered homeless, 2,240 buildings were damaged, of which 359 were completely destroyed. Throughout the city, power was knocked out and telephone service was cut.

In the Inhassunge Province,  of rice were lost and thousands of coconut trees were downed by the storm. Throughout the district, some schools were damaged while 800 homes were destroyed.
Within the province of Sofala,  of harvest were destroyed, 28,174 people were rendered homeless, and 1,389 buildings were destroyed. Elsewhere, many rivers along the southern and central part of the nation were flooded; consequently;  of crops were destroyed. The Pungwe River experienced its worst flood of the 1980s, but the worst flooding took place along the Limpopo River. Near the Pungwe River, a road that connected Mozambique to Zimbabwe was destroyed. Many nearby homes and fields were destroyed, forcing numerous families to seek shelter. Throughout the nation of Mozambique, large portions of the maize, potatoes, tomatoes, cucumber, and pumpkin crops were washed away due to flooding.

Overall, the storm brought considerable damage to the nation; it was also the first storm to affect the nation since Tropical Storm Domoina in 1984. Damage totaled to $10 million (1988 USD). Property damage alone totaled to $1.5 million, just under $1 million of which came from buildings. Moreover, insured losses from the storm totaled $1 million. Even though the death toll was initially believed to be 57; by March 14, this number had increased to the final death toll of 100 after additional information was received from remote areas of the country. About 90,000 people were directly affected by the system.

See also

Cyclone Nadia
Cyclone Japhet
Tropical Storm Lisette
South-West Indian Ocean tropical cyclone season

Notes

References

Filao
Filao
Filao
Filao